Deuces Wild is a 2002 American crime drama film.

Deuces Wild may also refer to: 

Deuces Wild (band), a German pop band
Deuces Wild (B.B. King album), 1997
Deuces Wild (Frankie Laine album), 1962
Deuces Wild (Sonny Stitt album), 1966
Dueces Wild (Vast Aire album), 2008
A variant of poker where 2 ("deuce") is a wild card